Paul Rudolph may refer to:
 Paul Rudolph (American football), current head coach of Minot State University football team
 Paul Rudolph (architect) (1918–1997), American architect
 Paul Rudolph (musician) (born 1947), Canadian guitarist
 Paul Rudolph (physicist) (1858–1935), German optical mathematician who designed lenses for the Zeiss company
Paul Rudolph, character in The Accused (1988 film)